Khondokar Mohammad Rajin Saleh Alam (born November 20, 1983) is a Bangladeshi former cricketer, who played Tests and ODIs. He was recognised for his outstanding fielding attributes and was one of the best fielders of his generation. He was also a member of the national 2006 ICC Champions Trophy and 2007 Cricket World Cup squads. In November 2018, he announced his retirement from first-class cricket.

International career
He was the twelfth man of the inaugural Test that Bangladesh played against India on November 10, 2000. He then spent three years out of the national squad. He made his Test debut against Pakistan in 2003 when they made a trip to that country. He also made his ODI debut in that same series. During and after that series he proved himself to be one of the regular members of the national team. In 2004 ICC Champions Trophy he captained the side in the absence of the injured Habibul Bashar. He also made an unbeaten knock of 108 against Kenya to become the third Bangladeshi batsman to score a century in One-day Internationals.

References

1983 births
Living people
Bangladesh One Day International cricketers
Bangladesh Test cricketers
Bangladeshi cricketers
Bangladeshi cricket captains
Cricketers at the 2007 Cricket World Cup
Sylhet Division cricketers
People from Sylhet
Cricket Coaching School cricketers
Mohammedan Sporting Club cricketers
Partex Sporting Club cricketers
Bangladesh East Zone cricketers
Wicket-keepers